The Limerick Senior Hurling Championship is an annual club competition between the top hurling clubs in Limerick. The winners of the Limerick Championship qualify to represent their county in the Munster Club Championship, the winners of which go on to the All-Ireland Senior Club Hurling Championship.

Overview

Championship structure
The Limerick county championship does not operate on a group system; it instead uses a knock-out system with a last chance backdoor system for teams knocked out in the first and second rounds.

The 16 teams are randomly drawn into 8 first round ties. The 8 winners progress to round 2. These 8 teams are drawn in 4 games with the winners of each progressing to the quarter finals. The 8 teams beaten in round 1 are drawn together into 4 games where the losers go into the relegation playoffs and the winners go on to be drawn against the beaten teams from round 2, the winners of which will take the 4 remaining quarter final positions.

Teams
Sixteen teams will contest the 2007 Limerick County Championship.  These teams are:
City : Claughaun, Na Piarsaigh, Patrickswell.
East : Ahane, East Geraldines, Doon, Murroe-Boher.
South: Bruree, Croom, Garryspillane,  Kilmallock, Knockainey.
West : Adare, Granagh-Ballingarry, Tournafulla, Killeedy,

Results

First round

Second round

Winners Group

Adare 4–15,  East Geraldines 1–14;
Croom 1–12,  Ahane 0–14;
Granagh Ballingarry 1–11,  Claughaun 0–8;
Murroe Boher 1–14,  Kilmallock 0–14;

Losers Group

Patrickswell 3–15,  Garryspillane 1–16;
Knockainey 1–18,  Doon 1–10;
Bruree 5–11,  Tournafulla 1–6;
Na Piarsaigh 2–15, Kileedy 1–10;

Relegation Playoffs

Doon 0–13,  Garryspillane 0–13;
Tournafulla 1–17,  Killeedy 3–9;

replay
Garryspillane 2–9,  Doon 1–11;

Third round

Ahane 2–20,  Knockainey 0–7;
East Geraldines 1–22,  Na Piarsaigh 1–17;
Kilmallock 2–16,  Patrickswell 1–11;
Claughaun 0–10,  Bruree 0–8;

Relegation Final
Doon  0–17, Kileedy 1–4.

 *Kileedy relegated to intermediate hurling for 2008. Dromin-Athlacca will take their place as they won the 2007 Limerick Intermediate hurling championship.

Quarter finals

Adare 1–16,  Ahane 1–15.
Murroe-Boher 1–13,  Claughaun 0–11.
Kilmallock 3–22,  Granagh-Ballingarry 0–15.
Croom 0–20,  East Geraldines 1–11.

Semi finals

Adare 0–24, Murroe Boher 2-08
Croom 1–13, Kilmallock 1-08

Final

Adare  0–14, Croom 0-05

Championship statistics

Miscellaneous
Croom qualify for the final for the first time since 1948.

References

Limerick Senior Hurling Championship
Limerick Senior Hurling Championship